This is a list of all the reasons written by Thomas Cromwell during his tenure as puisne justice of the Supreme Court of Canada.

2009
 R v Strecko , 2009 SCC 2, [2009] 1 S.C.R. 64
 R v Middleton, 2009 SCC 21 (Dissent)
 R v Van, 2009 SCC 22 (Dissent)
 R v Godin, 2009 SCC 26 (Majority)
 R v Layton, 2009 SCC 36, [2009] 2 S.C.R. 540 (Dissent)
 Galambos v Perez, 2009 SCC 48, [2009] 3 S.C.R. 247 (Unanimous)
 R v Burke, 2009 SCC 57, [2009] 3 S.C.R. 566 (Dissent)

2010
{| width="100%"
|-
|
{| width="100%" align="center" cellpadding="0" cellspacing="0"
|-
! bgcolor=#CCCCCC | Statistics
|-
|

2011
{| width="100%"
|-
|
{| width="100%" align="center" cellpadding="0" cellspacing="0"
|-
! bgcolor=#CCCCCC | Statistics
|-
|

2012

{| width="100%"
|-
|
{| width="100%" align="center" cellpadding="0" cellspacing="0"
|-
! bgcolor=#CCCCCC | Statistics
|-
|

2013

{| width="100%"
|-
|
{| width="100%" align="center" cellpadding="0" cellspacing="0"
|-
! bgcolor=#CCCCCC | 2013 statistics
|-
|

2014

Cromwell